Domingos Quina (born 18 November 1999) is a Portuguese professional footballer who plays for EFL Championship club Rotherham United, on loan from EFL Championship club Watford.

Born in Guinea-Bissau, he has represented Portugal at international youth level. He is the son of former Portugal international defender Samuel Quina.

Club career

West Ham
Having spent time at the academies of Benfica and Chelsea, he was offered a contract by Arsenal, but Quina decided to sign for West Ham United in May 2016 with the expectation that he would join the squad in July 2016 and sign a professional contract on his 17th birthday in November 2016. He made his debut, coming on as an 81st-minute substitute for Michail Antonio, against NK Domzale in the Europa League on 28 July 2016 and also played a part in the second leg in a 3–0 win in the club's first ever match at London Stadium. On 3 October 2016, Quina scored a widely praised goal for West Ham Under 23's, by scoring a chip from near the halfway line against Leicester Under 23's side.

Having turned 17, Quina signed his first professional contract with West Ham in November 2016 which could keep him at the club until 2019. In the same year, he received two nominations for Premier League 2 "Player of the Month" for October, merited for his performances against Aston Villa, Middlesbrough and West Bromwich Albion respectively. His performances for West Ham Under 23's saw Sky Sports describe Quina as a 'wonderkid'.

Watford
On 9 August 2018, Quina signed for Watford on a four-year contract for an undisclosed fee, believed to be £1 million. He made his Watford debut on 29 August in a second round EFL Cup game away to Reading. With Watford already leading 1–0, Quina scored with a driving shot, described as "superb", from 30 yards to make to score 2–0, the final result. He made his Premier League debut for the club on 4 December 2018 coming as a substitute in a 2–1 home loss against Manchester City and his first league start in the following match, on 10 December 2018, in a 2–2 away draw against Everton. On 15 December, he became the youngest Watford player to score in the Premier League, in a match against Cardiff City.

Loan spells
On 1 February 2021, Quina joined La Liga side Granada on loan until the end of the season.

On 31 August 2021, Quina joined recently relegated Championship side Fulham on a season-long loan deal with the club holding the option to make the deal permanent.

On 1 February 2022, Quina joined Championship side Barnsley on loan for the remainder of the 2021–22 season. He scored his first goal for the club against Queens Park Rangers on 12 February 2022. The loan was terminated on 26 April 2022 after Barnsley were relegated.

On 16 August 2022, Quina returned to Spain and its top tier after agreeing to a one-year loan deal with Elche. The deal was cut short on transfer deadline day, 31 January 2023, and Quina immediately moved to fellow Championship side Rotherham United on loan until the end of the 2022–23 season.

International career
Having moved to Portugal as a young child, Quina has represented that nation at the under-17, under-18, under-19 and under-20 levels. He won the UEFA European Under-17 Championship with Portugal in May 2016. In July 2018, he was a member of the U19 team which won the UEFA European Under-19 Championship beating Italy U19 4-3 after extra time.

Career statistics

Honours
Portugal U17
UEFA European Under-17 Championship: 2016

Portugal U19
UEFA European Under-19 Championship: 2018

Individual
2016 UEFA European Under-17 Championship Team of the Tournament
UEFA European Under-19 Championship Team of the Tournament: 2018

References

External links

Watford player profile

Living people
1999 births
Sportspeople from Bissau
Association football midfielders
Portuguese footballers
Portugal youth international footballers
Bissau-Guinean footballers
Bissau-Guinean emigrants to Portugal
Portuguese people of Bissau-Guinean descent
Chelsea F.C. players
S.L. Benfica footballers
West Ham United F.C. players
Watford F.C. players
Granada CF footballers
Fulham F.C. players
Barnsley F.C. players
Elche CF players
Rotherham United F.C. players
Premier League players
English Football League players
La Liga players
Portuguese expatriate footballers
Portuguese expatriate sportspeople in England
Expatriate footballers in England
Portuguese expatriate sportspeople in Spain
Expatriate footballers in Spain